Gwespyr is a village in Flintshire on the north coast of Wales in the community of Llanasa. Gwespyr had a population of 289 people in the United Kingdom 2001 census. It overlooks Point of Ayr on the west side of the River Dee estuary and its sandy beaches with dunes. The hills of the Clwydian Range behind the village form the eastern boundary of the Vale of Clwyd. Gwespyr also looks respectively Welsh but is an alien name. It represents Old English for 'West-bury' which came to be interpreted as the 'west fort' meaning the westernmost fort in Mercia. Originally, it is thought to have been a strategic Mercian lookout which was reduced in importance with the development of a fortified Rhuddlan.

Gwespyr stone has been quarried in quantity from Roman times and shipped to the rest of the UK and abroad. "Gwespyr Stone" was commercially successful for its grain, colour, and quality of cutting and shaping. It was used for many buildings around Gwespyr, and was also used to build the ancient Maen Achwyfan Cross at Whitford, the chapel at St Winefride's Well in Holywell, stone carvings in Rhuddlan Castle and Denbigh Castle, St Asaph Cathedral, The Talacre Arms Public house in Gwespyr and Basingwerk Abbey in Greenfield, Flintshire. Gwespyr stone was also found on sites such as Prestatyn Castle and the Roman bath house in Prestatyn. There is evidence of the stone industry in Gwespyr prevalent even today, though all but one quarry is disused. The quarry in use today is home to Delyn Metal.

Tourism
Gwespyr is home to two caravan parks. Tree Tops Caravan Park on New Road. won its category in Wales in Bloom since 1992. "Sea View Caravan Park" is located on Gwespyr Hill and up until the late 1990s was owned by the Reynolds family. Since its take over by Talacre Beach Leisure it has undergone regeneration. The site is a "sister park" to Talacre Beach Caravan park located in nearby Talacre and they share leisure and entertainment facilities.

Religion

Gwespyr has been home to at least three Chapels during its history. Only two remain standing today, but they are now private houses. Gwespyr's chapels are listed as Calvinistic Methodist and Wesleyan. "Gwespyr Chapel", located in on Tanrallt Road, was Calvinistic Methodist and built in 1860. It had a congregation averaging 136 people between 1911 - 1960. "Wesley's Memorial Chapel" is also located on Tanrallt Road and was Wesleyan by denomination. The chapel was built in 1841 and was attended by an average of 140 worshipers between 1911 - 1960; services at the chapel where conducted in the Welsh language. Another chapel belonging to the Church in Wales was built during the 1960s in a stunning location perched on the top of Gwespyr Hill opposite the Reservoir. The structure was built out of tin and was nicknamed "The Tin Chapel" by the locals. The church was opened after the closure of its counterparts on Tanrallt Road but closed in the late 1970s and the congregation was moved to nearby Llanasa Parish Church. Church services were also held every other Sunday at Gwespyr Village Hall by the Minister from Llanasa to aid the elderly community who could not make the journey to nearby Llanasa. These services ceased due to falling numbers and changes at the Village Hall in 2001.

Gwespyr Village Hall

Gwespyr Village Hall was built in 1952. It was used initially by the local people as a meeting place and a variety of clubs where subsequently formed and based at the Hall, including a Bowls Club, Indoor Shooting range club, Bingo, a Youth club and a Snooker club. The Village Hall could be rented by local residents for parties and events. In the 1980s, two extensions were built, funded by Local government grants. A sub Post office was introduced at that time. The Village Hall was also home to Gwespyr Sounds Productions between 1998 - 2004 for its bands and music acts to rehearse. The Village Hall became redundant in 2004. A new committee was formed in June 2010 and registered as a Charitable organization and work began to regenerate the building. New events and openings began in May 2011. The Village Hall once again became redundant during the COVID-19 pandemic. A new committee was formed and the hall is due to re-open in 2022.

War Memorial

Gwespyr War Memorial sits in a small memorial garden near the top of Gwespyr Hill and was designed by R.Bruce Esq of Talacre. It commemorates all of those men who fought in World War I, together with the one soldier who died in action. One soldier killed in World War II is commemorated. The memorial was originally erected by Sir Pyres William Mostyn Baronet to commemorate Queen Victoria's diamond jubilee 14 August 1897.

Legend

Frank Nicholson of Gwespyr was a Welsh baritone, a National Eisteddfod winner, and a wireless singer, who was attacked and killed by a stallion while walking home on a footpath leading from Talacre Abbey (known by the locals as "the park") to Gwespyr on Monday 8 October 1928. Three weeks later a woman was seriously injured by the stallion at the same place.

Amenities

Public Houses

The village is home to two public houses. "The Masons Arms" is located near the top of Gwespyr Hill. The pub was owned by Allied Breweries and served Ansells beer until the mid-1990s when the pub was bought by private owners. The pub is still open today.

"The Talacre Arms" was situated midway up Gwespyr Hill. The pub was popular during the 1960s when it was owned by Marston's Brewery until the mid-1990s when it was bought by private owners; it closed in May 2011 and is now a residential building.

Restaurants
On the corner of the A548 and Gwespyr Hill is Amber Coffee House inside the Ivy Emporium. Amber Coffee House sits on the site of the former 'The Lodge' public house which was popular for its live music while serving mainly the holidaying public. In more recent times, Amber Coffee House is on the A548 road. Directly across is "The Totem Pole" which is a small village restaurant. It has a theme throughout that is based on the Indigenous peoples of the Americas.

Playground
There is a play area across from the Masons Arms public house that is maintained by Flintshire County Council. The play area has a top and bottom part. The top is home to typical play equipment white the bottom area is one of many empty quarries - this is now home to a basketball court.

Shops

The Village shop was located on Tanrallt Road but closed in the early 1990s and became a private residence. The village shop prior to it closing was very traditional selling groceries. It also served as the Village Post Office until its closure. At the bottom of Gwespyr Hill on the A548 coast road is the local garage and shop 'Lobitos', which started life in the 1950s as a general car repair garage, fuel station and cafe serving the locality and holiday traffic along the North Wales coast.

Transport
Bus services are provided by Arriva Buses Wales. There are two bus stops serving the village, one on Tanrallt Road across from the former shop and the other on the A548 coast road next to the old Cam Gas Store.

References 

Villages in Flintshire